Moktar Mangane (born November 15, 1982, Rufisque) is a Senegalese footballer who currently plays for Tours FC.

External links
 lequipe.fr

1982 births
Living people
Senegalese footballers
Association football defenders
Louhans-Cuiseaux FC players
FC Metz players
Tours FC players
Ligue 2 players
Expatriate footballers in France